Calyptra bicolor is a moth of the  family Erebidae. It is found in India. It has been known to feed on humans, as well as a variety of other mammals.

References

Calpinae
Moths described in 1883